Acronicta sinescripta is a moth of the family Noctuidae. It is found from South Carolina to Highlands County, Florida and westward through the Gulf States to Louisiana.

Adults are on wing from March to September. There are four generations per year.

External links
Images
 Acronicta sinescripta in Louisiana

Acronicta
Moths of North America
Moths described in 1989